Pflüger is a German surname meaning "ploughman/plowman", the user of a plough. It may refer to:

August Pfluger (born 1978), American military officer and politician
Eduard Friedrich Wilhelm Pflüger (1829–1910), German physiologist
Friedbert Pflüger, German politician, member of the German Bundestag
Tobias Pflüger, German politician, member of the European Parliament

See also
Plowman
Pflueger
Pflugerville, Texas, city, United States

Surnames
German-language surnames
Occupational surnames